Quello che sei is the fifth studio album of the Italian band Punkreas, released in 2005.

Track listing
 American Dream - 3:59
 Satanasso - 3:43
 Un momento migliore - 3:32
 L'uomo con le branchie - 3:26
 Prima fila - 3:24
 Questa è la storia - 3:19
 Fratello poliziotto - 3:27
 Bastardi - 3:40
 Tutto vero - 3:08
 Chirurgo plastico - 4:20
 Vietato - 5:35

References

2005 albums
Punkreas albums